Vigny is a commune in the Val-d'Oise department in Île-de-France in northern France.

R&B singer Rihanna shot her music video for "Te Amo" at the château de Vigny in 2010.

See also
Communes of the Val-d'Oise department

References

External links

Association of Mayors of the Val d'Oise 
Pictures and video about Rihanna in Vigny 

Communes of Val-d'Oise